"Free Mind" is a song by Nigerian singer and record producer Tems. It was released through Leading Vibes Limited on 25 September 2020, as the third track from Tems's debut extended play, For Broken Ears. Tems wrote and produced the song, alongside co-producer Omeiza. On 21 June 2022, "Free Mind" peaked at number one on the US Afrobeats Songs chart, and in October 2022, reached number 46 on the Billboard Hot 100. It impacted US rhythmic contemporary radio as a single on August 9, 2022.

Composition
The Native wrote that "Free Mind" begins with "soft piano keys and a thumping bass" and its "catchy, self-produced (alongside Omeiza) beat sets the foundation for Tems' honest confessional. With recurring bass after every four bars, one will find themselves bopping their head to the bounce and in agreement with what she's saying in unison." Pulse.ng found that Tems "sings about doubt, fear and the mental strains of tough situations. It basically feels like a diary entry by the mentally strained. But instead of succumbing, she embraces the peace that comes with a 'Free Mind.'"

Critical reception
In review for The Native, Tami Makinde wrote "On the groovy standout "Free Mind", she mulls over thoughts of escapism trying to navigate life with a clouded mind." In review for Pulse Nigeria, Motolani Alake said in his final thought on "Free Mind", Motolani says: This way, Tems could have told a story of self, her manifesto, a short love story, and personal tales of empowerment for downtrodden. Another flaw of Tems’ use of her vocal range - it might feel non-explorative and singular to some finicky listeners.

Commercial performance
On 4 November 2021, Tems performed a live version of "Free Mind" at Tiny Desk Concerts. "Free Mind" debuted at number 90 on the US Billboard Hot 100 on 25 July 2022. On 21 June 2022, "Free Mind" reached number one on the US Afrobeats Songs chart. It also debuted at number 5 on the US R&B Songs chart, and reached number 22 on Mainstream R&B/Hip-Hop Airplay. "Free Mind" debuted at number 28 on Hot R&B/Hip-Hop Songs, and number 22 on R&B/Hip-Hop Airplay, where it hit #1 after 33 weeks, becoming only the second song to ever do so. It reached number 60 on the South African Local & International Streaming Chart Top 100, in the 23rd week of 2022.

Charts

Weekly charts

Year-end charts

Certifications

Release history

References

2020 songs
Tems (singer) songs
Songs written by Tems (singer)
Alternative R&B songs